Craig Dimech (born September 1970), known by his stage name Meck, is a British DJ who was the former head of free2air recordings and later Frenetic Recordings.

Known initially for the re-working of Leo Sayer's "Thunder in My Heart Again", he has gone on to forge a partnership with Italian vocalist, producer and DJ Dino Lenny.

Discography

Singles

 "Feels Like Home" samples "Don't You Want Me" by Felix
 "So Strong" samples "Hold That Sucker Down" by OT Quartet
 "Windmills" samples "The Windmills of Your Mind" by Dusty Springfield
 "Feels Like a Prayer" is a mashup of "Like a Prayer" by Madonna and "Feels Like Home"

References

English DJs
English dance musicians
English record producers
Remixers
Living people
1970 births